Dmitri Sarafutdinov (born 16 September 1986 in Korkino), also known as Dmitrii Sharafutdinov, is a professional Russian rock climber specializing in bouldering climbing competitions. He has won three World Championships, in 2007, 2011 and 2012 and one Bouldering World Cup in 2013.

Biography
Dmitri started climbing when he was six years old and trained in a small climbing gym in Korkino.

In 2002 he started competing in the youth speed and lead disciplines. In 2002 he won the bronze medal in speed Youth A at the World Youth Championship in Canteleu, France and in 2004 he won the bronze medal in lead Junior at the World Youth Championship in Edinburgh.

In 2003 he began competing in the senior categories, in lead, speed and bouldering disciplines and in 2004 he won the Russian Climbing Championship in bouldering. From 2007 he focused on bouldering where he achieved his greatest success.

On 24 April 2007 Dmitri took his first podium in the Bouldering World Cup placing second in Sofia, and on 23 June he gained his first victory at Fiera di Primiero, Italy. He ended the season in second place behind Kilian Fischhuber. In the same year he won his first gold medal at the World Championships in Avilés, Spain.

In 2011 he achieved five podiums and the final second place in the Bouldering World Cup and his second gold medal at the World Championships in Arco, Italy. In 2012 he won his third World Championships, in Paris.

In July 2012 he climbed his hardest route, the  Ali-Hulk extension in Rodellar, Spain. The route consists in a boulder (climbed without rope) and a sport climbing route linked together.

In 2013 he has won his first Bouldering World Cup title, with two wins, one second and two podiums finishes out of eight events.

Rankings

Climbing World Cup

Climbing World Championships

Climbing European Championships

Number of medals in the World Cup

Bouldering

See also
List of grade milestones in rock climbing
History of rock climbing
Rankings of most career IFSC gold medals

References

External links

 

1986 births
Living people
Russian rock climbers
People from Korkino
Sportspeople from Chelyabinsk Oblast
IFSC Climbing World Championships medalists
IFSC Climbing World Cup overall medalists
Boulder climbers